Sigrid Annamaria Bernson (born 28 December 1988 in Gothenburg) is a Swedish singer and professional dancer. Bernson began her career as one of the professional dancers on the TV4 series Let's Dance in 2011. She won the competition's seventh and ninth seasons, performing with Anton Hysén and Benjamin Ingrosso, respectively.

In 2015,  Bernson began a singing career and performed guest vocals on the song "Happy Hours" by John de Sohn. In 2017, she performed her debut solo single "This Summer" on Lotta på Liseberg. She participated in Melodifestivalen 2018 with the song "Patrick Swayze", and qualified to the Andra Chansen round from the first semi-final, where she was eliminated from the competition by DJ Mendez with his song Everyday.

Discography

Singles

Notes

References

1988 births
Living people
Swedish female dancers
Swedish pop singers
Universal Music Group artists
21st-century Swedish singers
21st-century Swedish women singers
Melodifestivalen contestants of 2018